Gloeckner is a surname. Notable people with the surname include:

Lorry Gloeckner (born 1956), Canadian hockey player
Phoebe Gloeckner (born 1960), American cartoonist, illustrator, painter, and novelist

See also
 Glöckner

Surnames of German origin